The Philippine Hockey Association, also known as Larong Hockey sa Pilipinas, Inc. is the national governing body for field hockey in the Philippines. It is recognized by the Asian Hockey Federation (AHF) and the International Hockey Federation (IHF).

POC President Jose Cojuangco, Jr. was appointed as the federation's chairman. In the POC general assembly held on January 27, 2016, the local Olympic body granted their recognition to LHP.

References

External links
 Philippine Hockey Association

Philippines
Hockey
Phil
Field hockey in the Philippines